The 2020 presidential campaign of Michael Bloomberg, a businessman and former mayor of New York City, began when he filed a statement of candidacy with the Federal Election Commission for the office of President of the United States as a member of the Democratic Party on November 21, 2019. His principal campaign committee was called "Mike Bloomberg 2020, Inc." The campaign officially launched on November 24, 2019, in Virginia, later than most other candidates for the Democratic nomination.

Prior to launching his campaign, Michael Bloomberg has been vocal in encouraging the Democratic Party to field a candidate with the best chance of defeating incumbent President Donald Trump. His political positions include gun control, climate change prevention, and city innovation. Bloomberg opted not to compete in the early states of Iowa, New Hampshire, Nevada and South Carolina, instead beginning his campaign with the Super Tuesday states. He financed his campaign personally and refused donations. He spent over five hundred million dollars of his own money on his campaign, one of the greatest single campaign expenditures in American history. His campaign heavily relied on advertising, including the use of nationally aired television ads, social media influencers, and billboards in high-visibility locations.

Bloomberg dropped out of the race on March 4, 2020, after winning only the territory of American Samoa on Super Tuesday while missing the 15% threshold for proportional delegates in several states. He subsequently endorsed former Vice President Joe Biden for the nomination, and announced an effort to use his campaign infrastructure to support Biden's primary bid and the eventual nominee. His lack of success among voters was attributed to poor debate performances, his former approval of stop-and-frisk in New York City and allegations of a sexist working environment at his company, Bloomberg LP.

Background 
Michael Bloomberg is a billionaire businessman who ran as a Republican for Mayor of New York City in 2001, serving from 2002 to 2013.  At various times in his life, he has been a Democrat, a Republican and an Independent.  On March 5, 2019, Bloomberg announced that he would not run for president in 2020; instead he encouraged the Democratic Party to "nominate a Democrat who will be in the strongest position to defeat Donald Trump". Sometime during the spring of 2019, Bloomberg also founded Hawkfish, a data and tech start-up focused on supporting Democratic candidates. The company was reportedly active in Virginia and Kentucky elections before shifting focus to the Bloomberg campaign.  On October 14, 2019, a day before the Democratic Party's fourth presidential debate, it was reported that Bloomberg was "still looking at" entering the race if Joe Biden were to drop out, but that "nothing can happen unless Biden drops out", according to an unnamed source reported to be close to the situation. Fellow billionaire Warren Buffett had expressed his approval of a potential Bloomberg presidential campaign as early as February 2019.

Activities prior to campaign launch 
In March 2019, Bloomberg originally announced that he would not run for president.

However, on November 7, 2019, Bloomberg changed his mind and announced that he was taking steps to enter the 2020 United States presidential election, and on November 8 he officially filed for the Alabama Democratic presidential primary. After qualifying in Michigan, on November 12, he filed his candidacy for the Arkansas primary. On November 13, he applied for the Tennessee ballot. On November 19, he gave three separate transactions of $106,500 to the Democratic National Committee along with $800,000 to the Democratic Grassroots Victory Fund.

Bloomberg has said he will begin his campaign with the Super Tuesday states, not competing in Iowa or New Hampshire. He did not attend his company's second annual New Economy Forum in Beijing on November 20, a sign that his developing presidential campaign was now "dead serious". The summit was on the same day as one of the Democratic presidential primary debates in Atlanta. He missed the deadline to file in New Hampshire, thus reinforcing his planned strategy to focus on the Super Tuesday states on March 3, Another sign of his presidential run came when the University of Minnesota cancelled Bloomberg's scheduled lecture at the Hubert H. Humphrey School of Public Affairs on December 5, 2019, saying that it could be unlawful and against university policy to host him for such a lecture if he is a candidate. Bloomberg's "Everytown for Gun Safety" political bloc had previously contributed large sums of money to many Democrats running in the 2018 Minnesota statewide and legislative elections.

Headquartered at facilities provided by Bloomberg Philanthropies, the campaign's staff at pre-launch included senior advisors Howard Wolfson, communications adviser Jason Schecter, advertising creator Bill Knapp, pollster Doug Schoen along with sometimes Bloomberg Philanthropies CEO Patti Harris and political consultants Brynne Craig, Mitch Stewart, and Dan Wagner; and, at launch, Kevin Sheekey (communications, government relations & marketing head for Bloomberg LP) was campaign manager.

On November 21, 2019, Bloomberg filed a statement of candidacy with the Federal Election Commission to declare himself as a Democratic candidate for president, though he said this was not a formal announcement, but a step towards making one if he decides to run.

2020 Presidential campaign 

Bloomberg officially declared his candidacy on November 24, 2019, during a campaign event in Virginia as well as in a campaign spot touting himself as a "doer and a problem solver" broadcast on YouTube. The campaign subsequently kicked off a television advertising campaign in about 100 markets within the Super Tuesday states, which are to contribute about 40 percent of total pledged delegates at the Democratic National Convention. On that date, his personal website, mikebloomberg.com, was repurposed for the presidential campaign.

In December 2019, Bloomberg hired Texas Democratic Party Vice Chair Carla Brailey as a senior campaign adviser and in January 2020, he hired California Democratic Party Vice Chair Alexandra Rooker for a senior advisory role. Both are superdelegates to the Democratic National Convention.

Bloomberg announced that he would finance his campaign personally and would not accept donations. In addition to spending on advertising, Bloomberg's campaign set aside between $15 million to $20 million to register a half million voters in five battleground states that had swung to Trump in 2016.

Bloomberg News
According to editor-in-chief John Micklethwait of Bloomberg News, because of Bloomberg's ownership of the News (which refrains from investigating its owner) as well as his candidacy in the Democratic Party primaries, it will likewise refrain from investigating rival candidates throughout the primaries. If "credible journalistic institutions" publish investigative reporting about any of the candidates, the News will "either publish those articles in full or summarize them," Micklethwait said. The Bloomberg Industry Group union, which does not represent News journalists, protested the ban; former Washington bureau chief Megan Murphy said it was "staggering" for the news outlet to prevent "an army of unbelievably talented reporters and editors from covering massive, crucial aspects of one of the defining elections of our time"; and the Trump administration decredentialed News reporters from attending further 2020 Trump campaign events.

The Atlantic notes that over the years, there have been numerous reports about the sexist work environment at Bloomberg News.

Despite its promise not to investigate Bloomberg's presidential rivals, the news agency published a blistering report on the Bernie Sanders and Elizabeth Warren campaigns and spending on Amazon office supplies ($233,348.51 and $151,240.90 respectively, in nine months). Sanders campaign speechwriter David Sirota joined journalists in slamming the report. The article notes that Michael Bloomberg has not yet released his first campaign spending report.

Spending and advertising

Bloomberg decided on an unconventional primary strategy: not to compete in the four states that have primaries or caucuses in February, but to focus his efforts on the multi-state primary elections in March on what is known as Super Tuesday. Following the Iowa caucuses, after a delay in reporting the results produced a chaotic and uncertain outcome, he decided to double his television advertising in all the markets where he was already spending and to increase his campaign staff to 2,000 people.

In the fourth quarter of 2019, Bloomberg spent $188 million on his presidential campaign, including $132 million on television ads, $8.2 million on digital ads, $3.3 million on polling, $1.5 million on rent, and $757,000 on airfare, including $646,000 for a private jet. By the end of January 2020, Bloomberg spent $300 million on his campaign and by February 2020 had exceeded $500 million. This caused the total spending in the presidential primary on behalf of all candidates to exceed $1 billion by February, an unprecedented figure for such an early point in a US presidential election.

Television ads
The campaign launched campaign ads in markets in every state nationally on December 4, 2019. By December 31, 2019 – five weeks after declaring his candidacy – he had spent or committed $200 million on advertising, producing "an onslaught of campaign commercials with no precedent in Democratic politics".

Bloomberg spent $10 million on a 60-second ad slot during Super Bowl LIV that aired on February 2, 2020.

Digital and social media campaigns
Bloomberg's digital campaign set aside $100 million for anti-Trump social media ads in swing states. By January 2020, Bloomberg spent an estimated $15 million on pay-per-click Google ads promoting his campaign on search results for terms including "impeachment", "climate change", and "gun safety". In January 2020, Bloomberg spent $8.53 million in targeted Facebook ads.

In addition to digital ads, Bloomberg's campaign recruited social media influencers to advertise online. The campaign used Tribe, a content marketplace for brands to solicit content from social media personalities, to offer a $150 payment to influencers who post a video or a still image with overlay text in support of Bloomberg. Bloomberg's campaign worked with Meme 2020, a social media company led by Jerry Media CEO Mick Purzycki, to pay popular Instagram accounts to post "self-aware ironic" memes about Bloomberg. In February 2020, the campaign hired 500 "deputy digital organizers", who are paid $2,500 per month to promote Bloomberg on their personal social media accounts and in text messages to their contact lists.

Billboards
In February 2020, Bloomberg's campaign purchased billboard space in Las Vegas, Nevada and Phoenix, Arizona ahead of President Trump's campaign rallies in the two cities. The billboards, placed in high-visibility locations along Trump's potential motorcade route and outside the Trump International Hotel Las Vegas, displayed phrases including "Donald Trump cheats at golf", "Donald Trump eats burnt steak", "Donald Trump lost the popular vote", and "Donald Trump went broke running a casino."

Voting
Bloomberg led the midnight vote in the tiny townships of Dixville Notch, New Hampshire. Although not on the ballot in the 2020 New Hampshire Democratic primary, Bloomberg received three write-in votes in Dixville Notch: two in the Democratic primary and one in the Republican primary.

"Super Tuesday" results and suspension of campaign
In the March 3, 2020 "Super Tuesday" primaries, Bloomberg finished in third or fourth place in most of the 14 states involved, picking up a total of 61 delegates out of the more than 1,000 that were available.  On March 4, 2020, Bloomberg suspended his campaign, stating, "I'm a believer in using data to inform decisions. After yesterday's results, the delegate math has become virtually impossible – and a viable path to the nomination no longer exists."  Bloomberg then endorsed Joe Biden.

Following the suspension of his campaign, Bloomberg donated money to nonprofits which register people of color to vote. This includes a $2 million donation to Collective Future, a group that registers black voters, and a $500,000 donation to Voto Latino, which registers young Latinos as voters.

Criticism and controversies

Transphobic comments 
In 2020, Buzzfeed News unearthed video footage from 2019, of Bloomberg at a Bermuda Business Development Agency gathering referring to transgender individuals as "it" and "some guy in a dress."

Prison phone bank
The Intercept reported on December 24, 2019, that the Bloomberg campaign had unwittingly used prison labor to support the campaign. Call center ProCom was contracted to make calls through a third-party vendor; two of the company's call centers are located in state prisons in Oklahoma. Female inmates at the Dr. Eddie Warrior Correctional Center called voters in California, ending the calls by revealing that the calls were paid for by the Bloomberg campaign but without mentioning they originated in a prison. The Bloomberg campaign acknowledged the calls but said they were unaware the calls originated in a prison and they have since severed ties with the company.

ProCom said the company pays the Oklahoma minimum wage of $7.25 an hour to the Oklahoma Department of Corrections, which then pays the people working in the call centers. Documents from the Department of Corrections indicate they pay a maximum monthly wage for the incarcerated of either $20.00 or $27.09 per month.

Plagiarized campaign materials 
In February 2020, an analysis by The Intercept found that the Bloomberg campaign had plagiarized portions of its published policy proposals from news outlets, research publications, non-profit organizations, and policy groups without attribution. The report found that sections of the campaign's fact sheets for its plans on maternal care, LGBTQ equality, mental health, infrastructure, economy, tax policy, and mental health contained exact passages – ranging from individual sentences to full paragraphs – pulled from sources including CNN, CBS, Time, the John Jay College of Criminal Justice, the American Medical Association, Everytown for Gun Safety, and Building America's Future Educational Fund, the latter two of which Bloomberg co-founded or financed.

In response to the report, Bloomberg's campaign released a statement asserting that the lack of attribution resulted from its use of the email service, MailChimp, that it used to distribute the campaign material, explaining that MailChimp does not support footnote citations formatting. The campaign added, "When we announce policy platforms, we put together detailed fact sheets with context and supporting background, so that reporters understand the problem we're trying to solve with our policy...We have since added citations and links to these documents."

Former mayoralty of New York City

"Stop and frisk" approval
On February 5, 2015, Bloomberg made comments at the Aspen Institute and, while addressing issues of minority rights, policing policy, and gun control, Bloomberg had said that police should confiscate guns of African Americans between ages 15 and 25. "These kids think they're going to get killed anyway because all their friends are getting killed. So they just don't have any long-term focus or anything. It's a joke to have a gun. It's a joke to pull a trigger." He has stated that police should "throw [African Americans] up against the wall and frisk them." Bloomberg's approval of stop-and-frisk policies in New York City during his mayoralty has received widespread condemnation from the public and police alike. He eventually disavowed the controversial practice after announcing his campaign. Bloomberg stated at one point that "One of the unintended consequences is people say, 'Oh my God, you are arresting kids for marijuana. They're all minorities.' Yes, that's true. Why? Because we put all the cops in the minority neighborhoods. Yes, that's true. Why do you do it? Because that's where all the crime is."

The comments were criticized by many as racist, including President Trump, who tweeted "WOW, BLOOMBERG IS A TOTAL RACIST!"

Bloomberg subsequently claimed that "I inherited the police practice of stop-and-frisk, and as part of our effort to stop gun violence it was overused. By the time I left office, I cut it back by 95%, but I should've done it faster and sooner. I regret that and I have apologized." This claim has been disputed by many in the media, who point to Bloomberg's past statements and actions as Mayor as evidence that he supported and expanded the practice.

National co-chair of Sanders's campaign Nina Turner called for Bloomberg to drop out of the race over the issue. Sanders said at a February 16 dinner in Las Vegas, "Regardless of how much money a multibillionaire candidate is willing to spend on his election, we will not create the energy and excitement we need to defeat Donald Trump if that candidate pursued, advocated for and enacted racist policies like stop-and-frisk, which caused communities of color in his city to live in fear."

Comments regarding redlining
In 2008 at the height of the housing/banking crisis, Bloomberg said at a university forum that the crisis "all started when there was a lot of pressure on banks to make loans to everyone," even in poor neighborhoods, so that "banks started making more and more loans where the credit of the person buying the house wasn't as good as you would like." When a video of these comments was published in February 2020, they were widely interpreted as saying that he had blamed the crisis at least in part on the end of redlining – the practice of refusing to make bank loans in poor or minority neighborhoods. In response, a Bloomberg spokesman said that Bloomberg had always opposed redlining and fought against it as mayor.

Allegedly profane or sexist comments; nondisclosure agreements 

A booklet of quotes attributed to Bloomberg, titled The Wit and Wisdom of Michael Bloomberg was created as a gift to him in 1990. Some quotes included by the Washington Post include lewd and sexist comments directed at Bloomberg employees; One example described Bloomberg Terminals as computers that "will do everything, including give you [oral sex]. I guess that puts a lot of you girls out of business."

A former Bloomberg saleswoman also alleged that Bloomberg once joked that "All of you girls line up to give him [oral sex] as a wedding present." Her lawsuit also alleged that when Bloomberg saw a woman he was attracted to, he would say "I'd f*** that in a second." In a quote relating to an actress he was attracted to, Bloomberg is quoted as saying "If women wanted to be appreciated for their brains, they’d go to the library instead of to Bloomingdale's."

Bloomberg has received criticism during the February debate for disallowing women who had settled suits against his company to publicly air their grievances. On February 21, Bloomberg said that three women employed by his company, the only ones whose complaints related to him, would be released if desirous from their nondisclosure agreements.

Twitter troll accounts  
Twitter had suspended 70 troll accounts that posted content in support of Bloomberg's presidential campaign. A Twitter spokesperson told TIME that it has "taken enforcement action on a group of accounts for violating our rules against platform manipulation and spam." Twitter said that Bloomberg's campaign violated Twitter's rules against "creating multiple accounts to post duplicative content," "posting identical or substantially similar Tweets or hashtags from multiple accounts you operate" and "coordinating with or compensating others to engage in artificial engagement or amplification, even if the people involved use only one account."

Edited debate footage 
On February 20, 2020, Bloomberg's official Twitter account shared a manipulated video of the previous night's Democratic debate in Las Vegas. The video featured Bloomberg saying "I'm the only one here that's ever started a business. Is that fair?" followed by a series of clips from various moments of the debate, which were edited together to appear as if Bloomberg's question was followed by 20 seconds of silence from the other candidates. Bloomberg's campaign responded to criticism by saying that the video was intended to be "tongue-in-cheek".

Debates 
Bloomberg had declared his candidacy after most of the 2019 primary debates organized by the Democratic National Committee. After declaring, he failed to meet the requirements to participate in the debates December 2019 and January 2020 debates, as the DNC required participating candidates to demonstrate at least 4-percent support in at least four separate national polls approved by the DNC (or 6 percent in two early state polls), in addition to donations "from at least 200,000 unique donors overall, and a minimum of 800 unique donors in at least 20 states." Various national polls conducted in December found that Bloomberg's candidacy registered at around four percent support. however he did not meet the donor threshold, as he was not accepting contributions.

By early January 2020, Bloomberg was found by Real Clear Politics to have reached about 5.6% support nationally, but he again failed to meet the donors requirement for the January debate.

On January 13, Bloomberg stated that "People often ask me, 'Why aren't you in the debates? It's simple: the party requires candidates to have a certain number of donations, but I've never accepted a nickel from anyone. Unlike President Trump, I've always been independent of the special interests. I hope the DNC changes its rules – I'd gladly participate – but I'm not going to change my principles." During the January debate, he tweeted an image of his face on a meatball and other odd photos, which were poorly received by social media users.

On January 31, 2020, the DNC changed its eligibility rules, eliminating the individual-donor threshold. This allowed Bloomberg to participate in future debates by merely meeting polling requirements.

February 19, 2020 debate 
On February 18, 2020, Bloomberg qualified to participate in the February 19 debate in Nevada. Bloomberg's debut debate performance was poorly received, with some pundits saying that his performance was "among the worst in the history of presidential debates." He was widely criticized for his answers regarding stop-and-frisk, workplace harassment, and allegations of harassment by female employees, many of whom were bound by non-disclosure agreements. Elizabeth Warren, as well as Joe Biden, challenged him to release the women from the non-disclosure agreements, to which he refused. It is reported that there are at least 64 women named in at least 40 lawsuits alleging sexual harassment or gender discrimination at Bloomberg LP.

After the debate, at a rally in Salt Lake City, Utah, Bloomberg stated that "Trump was the real winner of Las Vegas debate" and claimed that "If we choose a candidate who appeals to a small base like Senator Sanders, it will be a fatal error." Bloomberg's campaign staff manager Kevin Sheekey claimed that the night was actually a success for Bloomberg, stating that "You know you are a winner when you are drawing attacks from all the candidates. Everyone came to destroy Mike tonight, it didn't happen. Everyone wanted him to lose his cool. He didn't do it. He was the grownup in the room."

Political positions 

Bloomberg, who has said in an editorial he believes climate change cannot await favorable political winds, has funded Beyond Carbon, modeled on the effort he had previously co-founded along with the Sierra Club, Beyond Coal, which he credits as contributing to the closing of half of the U.S.'s coal-fired power stations.

He has advocated for greatly expanding U.S. healthcare programs to create essentially a hybrid single-payer healthcare he has dubbed Medicare for all' for people that are uncovered."

Bloomberg's "All-In Economy" agenda, especially focused on assisting mid-sized cities in the economically lagging American heartland in their becoming economic growth generators, would include increased federal funding for community-colleges, technical training programs, and job-creating research and development endeavors that "invest in college partnerships and apprenticeships that connect people with identifiable jobs and career paths"; provide to workers, whether gig work, contract and franchise employees, union organizing and collective bargaining rights; increase to the national minimum wage to $15 an hour; increase to the Earned Income Tax Credit; and, creating "Business Resource Centers" to assist entrepreneurs.

Bloomberg's Greenwood Initiative aims to redress historic and institutional economic injustices that have affected Black Americans. The plan is focused on closing the economic gap between white and Black Americans by driving economic empowerment and helping to create generational wealth.

Bloomberg said that he is open to spending 1 billion dollars to support the Democratic candidate in the presidential election, even if it will be Bernie Sanders or Elizabeth Warren. In February, the Sanders campaign declined financial help from Bloomberg should it receive the nomination and Bloomberg's spokesperson said Bloomberg would not assist a candidate who did not desire his assistance. Bloomberg also said that he will not run ads against his rivals in the Democratic primaries. Though on February 17, Bloomberg ran an attack ad against Sanders's supporters accusing them of using online bullying tactics to mute criticism of their candidate. The ad showed screenshots of alleged Sanders supporters using memes, alleged threatening texts, and other tweets.

Private spending toward policy goals 

Part of Bloomberg's long-time political modus operandi is funding of various nonprofits in support of such issues he supports as gun control (Bloomberg is the primary funder of Everytown for Gun Safety), climate-change prevention, and city innovation.

Campaigning in Philadelphia in January 2020, referencing $80 million he spent supporting Congressional candidates in the 2018 midterm elections, Bloomberg said, "I supported 24 candidates who were good on guns and good on environment, and 21 of them won, and that flipped the House. So if it wasn't for that, you wouldn't have [Speaker] Pelosi and you wouldn't have impeachment."

Endorsements

Bloomberg has faced criticism by a few media outlets for "buying endorsements". According to HuffPost, the presidential candidate donated millions of dollars to the Congressional candidates before later receiving their endorsements. Charities controlled by Michael Bloomberg, such as Bloomberg Philanthropies, have reportedly given grants and training to city mayors throughout the country soon forming a network of mayors willing to support his campaign. One incident reported by the Detroit Free Press had Bloomberg receiving an endorsement from Wayne County Executive Warren Evans after his campaign hired Evans's wife.

Post campaign
Bloomberg suspended his campaign on March 4, 2020, and he endorsed the Joe Biden 2020 presidential campaign. On March 20 he announced that he would transfer $18 million to the Democratic National Committee (DNC). He made a $2 million donation to the black voter registration group Collective Future and $500,000 for Voto Latino to register new voters. He has pledged to spend $15 million to $20 million to register voters in five purple states. In addition, he announced a $2 million donation to the progressive group Swing Left to help Democrats in competitive races. He donated $5 million to Stacey Abrams's Fair Fight 2020 to encourage voter-registration and oppose voter-suppression measures.

Despite having promised his campaign staff they would be guaranteed jobs through November, on March 20 Bloomberg announced he was laying off his staff, although some may be hired by the DNC or other campaigns. The announcement came during the COVID-19 pandemic in the United States. Former staff filed a class-action suit in the United States District Court for the Southern District of New York on March 23. The Bloomberg campaign noted that some former staffers had already been hired by the DNC and all former staffers were guaranteed health care coverage through April. On April 27, 2020, Bloomberg announced that he would pay health care costs for campaign workers through November 2020.

References

External links 
 

Bloomberg
Michael Bloomberg